St Michael and All Angels Church is a Grade II listed Anglican church in the village of Littlebredy, Dorset, England.

History 
The tower dates from the 14th-century, while the rest was rebuilt in 1850 by Benjamin Ferrey when the spire was also added.

Burials 

 William Williams MP
 Frederic Wallis

Gallery

See also 
 List of churches in West Dorset

References

Churches in Dorset
Grade II listed churches in Dorset
Church of England church buildings in Dorset
14th-century church buildings in England
Gothic Revival church buildings in England